Samuel Phelps (born 13 February 1804, Plymouth Dock (now Devonport), Plymouth, Devon, died 6 November 1878, Anson's Farm, Coopersale, near Epping, Essex) was an English actor and theatre manager. He is known for his productions of William Shakespeare's plays which were faithful to their original versions, after the derived works by Nahum Tate, Colley Cibber and David Garrick had dominated the stage for over a century.

Debut
Phelps made his début as Shylock in London at the Haymarket Theatre in 1837 and appeared under the management of William Charles Macready at the Theatre Royal, Drury Lane, who recognized Phelps as a potential rival and gave him little opportunity to display his talents, although Phelps did gain popularity in the roles of Captain Channel in Douglas William Jerrold's melodrama The Prisoner of War (1842), and of Lord Tresham in Robert Browning's A Blot in the 'Scutcheon (1843).

Success

It was not until the abolition of the Patent monopoly on theatrical production in 1843 that Phelps, with scene painter Thomas Longden Greenwood (1806–1879), and leading lady Mrs Mary Warner, was able to take over the management of the then-unfashionable Sadler's Wells Theatre. They revolutionized the production of Shakespeare's plays by restoring Shakespearean performances to the original text of the first folio and away from the adaptations of Colley Cibber, Nahum Tate and David Garrick that had been favored by the theatre-going public since the Restoration. Starting with Macbeth, Phelps staged all but four of Shakespeare's plays at Sadler's Wells, some of which (like The Winter's Tale and Measure for Measure) hadn't been performed since their premieres at the Globe Theatre.

Achievements
Phelps' most frequently performed role was Hamlet, but he counted Macbeth, Wolsey, Leontes, and Bottom among his greatest achievements. He was generally considered the finest King Lear of his generation, returning to Shakespeare's version, which had been replaced on stage for over a hundred and fifty years by Tate's happy ending adaptation The History of King Lear, and staging the first production of the original version since the Restoration in 1845. Bell's Weekly Messenger wrote "The majesty, as well as the paternal tenderness of Lear, is preserved throughout; the grief, despair, and madness are kingly; and the business which the action inspires is heightened by the consciousness of the greatness of the mind that is suffering."

Phelps other great creation was his Falstaff, which the German publication Gesammelte Werke called his finest role. He first played Shakespeare's fat knight in Henry IV, Part I in 1846. While not suited for the sensuality typically associated with the role, Phelps relied on his intelligence and aristocratic suaveness in his interpretation which he altered slightly in The Merry Wives of Windsor, portraying a gentlemanly knight who observed the standards of decorum regardless of the vulgarity of his current surroundings. His production of Pericles, Prince of Tyre, the first regular revival of that play since the seventeenth century, emphasized spectacle in a way that set the pattern for many future productions. In 1864, as part of the celebrations of Shakespeare's tricentennial, he played the title role in Cymbeline at the Theatre Royal, Drury Lane; Helen Faucit was Imogen.

Sadly, Phelps' skills declined in old age so that critics no longer cared for his work in tragic plays, approving only his performances in comic roles like Falstaff and Bottom. But in his prime, he was the most versatile actor of his generation. A definitive biography, Samuel Phelps & the Sadler's Wells Theatre, was written by Shirley S. Allen in 1971.

Phelps was buried in a family grave (plot no.15452) on the western side of Highgate Cemetery.

References
 Samuel Phelps and Sadler's Wells Theatre Shirley S. Allen (Wesleyan, 1971) 

1804 births
1878 deaths
Burials at Highgate Cemetery
English male Shakespearean actors
Male actors from Devon
19th-century English male actors
Actor-managers
People from Devonport, Plymouth
English male stage actors